The Kuwait Handball Association (KHA) is the  administrative and controlling body for handball and beach handball in State of Kuwait. KHA is a founder member of the Asian Handball Federation (AHF) and member of the International Handball Federation (IHF) since 1970. Handball in Kuwait was founded by Sheikh Fahad Al-Ahmed Al-Jaber Al-Sabah, who is a member of House of Sabah, the ruling family of Kuwait. He was also the first President of KHA.

KHA Presidents

National teams
 Kuwait men's national handball team
 Kuwait men's national junior handball team
 Kuwait men's national youth handball team
 Kuwait women's national handball team
 Kuwait women's junior national handball team
 Kuwait women's youth national handball team

Competitions hosted
 2020 Asian Men's Handball Championship
 2018 Asian Men's Club League Handball Championship
 2007 Asian Men's Club League Handball Championship
 2002 West Asian Games
 2000 Asian Men's Club League Handball Championship
 1995 Asian Men's Handball Championship
 1977 Asian Men's Handball Championship

Affiliated members

 Al-Arabi SC
 Burgan SC
 Al-Fahaheel FC
 Al-Jahra SC
 Kazma SC
 Khaitan SC
 Kuwait SC
 Al-Nasr SC

 Qadsia SC
 Al-Qurain SC
 Al Sahel SC
 Al-Salmiya SC
 Al-Shabab SC
 Al-Sulaibikhat SC
 Al Tadhamon SC
 Al-Yarmouk SC

References

External links
  

Sports governing bodies in Kuwait
Sports organizations established in 1966
1966 establishments in Kuwait